Danny Joseph Bakewell (born 1946) is an American civil rights activist and entrepreneur. He is the owner of The Bakewell Company, which includes among its holdings the Los Angeles Sentinel newspaper. He has been Chairman of the National Newspaper Publishers Association (NNPA) since 2009.

Early life and career

Bakewell was born and raised in New Orleans, graduating from St. Augustine High School.

Bakewell is the co-founder of the National Black United Fund. He also served as President of The Brotherhood Crusade, a civil rights advocate organization, for over 30 years, before stepping down to focus on his other projects. 

In recent years, Bakewell has been focused on expanding and diversifying his firm The Bakewell Company, which is the largest minority-owned development firm on the West Coast. He purchased the Los Angeles Sentinel, the city's oldest and largest Black newspaper, in 2004. Soon after, in 2007, he purchased the New Orleans radio station WBOK. He later sold WBOK to a company owned partly by Wendell Pierce.

In 2009, Bakewell was elected Chairman of the National Newspaper Publishers Association.

Personal life

Bakewell and his wife Aline have two adult children and four grandchildren. Bakewell and his family currently reside in Bradbury, California.

He is Catholic.

References

External links
 Bakewell Co. website
 Danny Bakewell's Huffington Post blogs
 "Compton: Corruption, Incompetence, or Just Business As Usual?"

Living people
1946 births
American civil rights activists
Businesspeople from New Orleans
People from Bradbury, California

African-American Catholics
Roman Catholic activists